Baldur Ingimar Aðalsteinsson (born 12 February 1980) is a Icelandic footballer. He played several seasons in the Icelandic top-tier Úrvalsdeild karla and capped eight times for the Iceland national team.

References

External links
 
 

1980 births
Living people
Baldur Ingimar Adalsteinsson
Baldur Ingimar Adalsteinsson
Association football midfielders
Baldur Ingimar Adalsteinsson
Baldur Ingimar Adalsteinsson
Baldur Ingimar Adalsteinsson